The 2025 U Sports University Cup is scheduled to be held in March 2025, in Ottawa, Ontario, to determine a national champion for the 2024–25 U Sports men's ice hockey season.

Host
The tournament is scheduled to be played at TD Place Arena and will be hosted by the University of Ottawa. This will be the first time that the University of Ottawa will host the tournament and it will be the first time that the championship will be played in Ottawa.

Scheduled teams
Canada West Champion
OUA Champion
AUS Champion
Host (Ottawa Gee-Gees)
Two assigned berths from OUA
One assigned berth from Canada West
One assigned berth from AUS

References

External links 
 Tournament Web Site

U Sports men's ice hockey
Ice hockey competitions in Ottawa
University Cup, 2025
2023 in Ontario